Onepu is a rural community in the Whakatāne District and Bay of Plenty Region of the North Island of New Zealand. It is situated between Kawerau and Te Teko along State Highway 34, and lies immediately north-east of the Norske Skog Tasman pulp and paper mill.

The community lies on the Murupara Branch railway and is serviced by Rural Delivery route 2. A small airfield was located in Onepu, but it is no longer operational due to the geothermal projects running nearby.

The name "Onepu" comes from local Māori oral traditions. The New Zealand Ministry for Culture and Heritage gives a translation of "loose sandy soil" for Onepū.

Historically, Onepu was also the name of the surrounding district, including the site of the present town of Kawerau.

Onepu is within the rohe (tribal area) of the Ngāti Tūwharetoa iwi. The Hahuru Marae and meeting house, located west of Onepu, is a tribal meeting place for the hapū of Ngāti Irawharo, Ngāi Tamarangi, Ngāti Peehi, Ngāti Poutomuri, Ngāti Umutahi and Te Aotahi. It is named after the mother of Tūwharetoa, the eponymous ancestor of the iwi.

Demographics

Onepu Spring had a population of 1,221 at the 2018 New Zealand census, an increase of 135 people (12.4%) since the 2013 census, and an increase of 96 people (8.5%) since the 2006 census. There were 405 households, comprising 618 males and 603 females, giving a sex ratio of 1.02 males per female. The median age was 44.4 years (compared with 37.4 years nationally), with 237 people (19.4%) aged under 15 years, 207 (17.0%) aged 15 to 29, 600 (49.1%) aged 30 to 64, and 177 (14.5%) aged 65 or older.

Ethnicities were 74.7% European/Pākehā, 41.5% Māori, 1.2% Pacific peoples, 2.5% Asian, and 1.0% other ethnicities. People may identify with more than one ethnicity.

The percentage of people born overseas was 11.5, compared with 27.1% nationally.

Although some people chose not to answer the census's question about religious affiliation, 52.6% had no religion, 30.5% were Christian, 5.2% had Māori religious beliefs, 0.2% were Hindu, 0.2% were Muslim, 0.2% were Buddhist and 1.5% had other religions.

Of those at least 15 years old, 108 (11.0%) people had a bachelor's or higher degree, and 174 (17.7%) people had no formal qualifications. The median income was $32,400, compared with $31,800 nationally. 201 people (20.4%) earned over $70,000 compared to 17.2% nationally. The employment status of those at least 15 was that 534 (54.3%) people were employed full-time, 147 (14.9%) were part-time, and 51 (5.2%) were unemployed.

References

External links 
 

Whakatane District
Populated places in the Bay of Plenty Region